Slovakia has participated at the Youth Olympic Games in every edition since the inaugural 2010 Games and has earned medals from every edition.

Medal tables

Medals by Summer Games

Medals by Winter Games

Medals by summer sport

Medals by winter sport

List of medalists

Summer Games 
Medals awarded to participants of mixed-NOC (combined) teams are represented in italics. These medals are not counted towards the individual NOC medal tally.

Winter Games 
Medals awarded to participants of mixed-NOC (combined) teams are represented in italics. These medals are not counted towards the individual NOC medal tally.

Flag bearers

See also
Slovakia at the Olympics
Slovakia at the Paralympics
Slovakia at the European Games
Slovakia at the European Youth Olympic Festival
Slovakia at the Universiade
Slovakia at the World Games

 
Nations at the Youth Olympic Games